The women's shot put at the 2015 IPC Athletics World Championships was held at the Suheim Bin Hamad Stadium in Doha from 22 to 31 October.

Medalists

See also
List of IPC world records in athletics

References

shot put
2015 in women's athletics
Shot put at the World Para Athletics Championships